Lynx Lake, Arizona, is a  reservoir located within Prescott National Forest, approximately  east of Prescott, Arizona, in the Bradshaw Mountains. The lake is located at  elevation and is stocked for fishing. It is one of the most popular recreation areas in central Arizona. Mild weather, the cool ponderosa pine forest, trout fishing, boating, mountain hiking, horseback riding, archaeological sites, and bird watching attract visitors from throughout Arizona.

Ecology
Animals native to the area include mule deer, bald eagles, osprey, and javelinas. Several species have been introduced, including rainbow trout, bull frogs, and domestic ducks and geese. Arizona State Game and Fish Department periodically stocks the lake with rainbow trout. Largemouth bass and crappie are also present in the lake. The lake is open all year.

Plant life in the area consists of ponderosa pine, beargrass, cliff-rose, and alligator juniper.

Activities on Lynx Lake

 Fishing: The lake is open year-round for fishing and is stocked with rainbow trout periodically by the Arizona Game and Fish Department. Sunfish and Catfish (Channel), as well as bullfrogs, may be caught here.
 Camping: Two National Forest Campgrounds near the lake offer 36 campsites.
 Boating: Non-motorized and electric-powered boats are permitted on the lake.
 Hiking: The 2- mile Lakeshore Trail loops around the lake.
 Recreational gold panning

References

External links
 USDA Forest Website for Lynx Lake
 Prescott National Forest
 Arizona Boating Locations Facilities Map
 Arizona Fishing Locations Map
 Video of Lynx Lake, Arizona

Reservoirs in Yavapai County, Arizona
Prescott, Arizona
Prescott National Forest
Reservoirs in Arizona